Fudbalski klub Budućnost Banovići is a professional football club from the town of Banovići that is situated in the eastern part of Bosnia and Herzegovina.

In Bosnian Budućnost means "Future", which symbolizes the hope people had for the times to come when the club was founded in 1947.

The club plays its home matches at the Gradski Stadion, which has a capacity of 8,500 seats. Their primary colors are dark green and black.

Today, Budućnost is a member of the Football Association of Bosnia and Herzegovina. The club is active in the First League of the Federation of Bosnia and Herzegovina, which is the second division of football in Bosnia and Herzegovina.

Honours

Domestic

League
First League of Bosnia and Herzegovina:
Runners-up (1): 1999–00
First League of the Federation of Bosnia and Herzegovina:
Winners (3): 1997–98 , 2003–04, 2009–10
Runners-up (2): 2001–02, 2011–12
Second League of the Federation of Bosnia and Herzegovina:
Winners (2): 2017–18 , 2018–19

European record

P = Matches played; W = Matches won; D = Matches drawn; L = Matches lost; GF = Goals for; GA = Goals against; GD = Goals difference. Defunct competitions indicated in italics.

List of matches

Club seasons
Source:

Managerial history
 Smajil Karić
 Fuad Grbešić (2004–2005)
 Munever Rizvić (June 30, 2008 – July 1, 2011) 
 Munever Rizvić (September 10, 2012 – January 9, 2020)
 Igor Sliško (January 9, 2020 – October 15, 2020)
 Smajil Karić (January 18, 2021 – present)

References

External links
FK Budućnost Banovići at Facebook

 
Association football clubs established in 1947
Buducnost
Tuzla Canton
Sport in the Federation of Bosnia and Herzegovina
1947 establishments in Bosnia and Herzegovina